Wells Goodykoontz (June 3, 1872 – March 2, 1944) was a Republican politician from the U.S. state of West Virginia who served in the West Virginia Legislature representing Mingo County. He was President of the West Virginia Senate from 1917 to 1919, and a Member of the U.S. House of Representatives from the now-defunct 5th congressional district of West Virginia. He served during the 66th and 67th United States Congresses.

Goodykoontz was born near Newbern, Virginia in Pulaski County on June 3, 1872. He was educated under private tutors and attended Oxford Academy at Floyd, Virginia and Washington and Lee University School of Law. He was admitted to the bar in 1893 and began practicing law at Williamson, West Virginia in 1894. He also worked in banking.

He served as a member of the West Virginia House of Delegates in 1911 and 1912. He then served as a member of the State Senate from 1914 to 1918. He was President of the Senate and Lieutenant Governor (ex officio) from 1917 until December 1, 1918.

He served as president of the West Virginia Bar Association in 1917 and 1918. He chaired the central legal advisory board for West Virginia during the First World War. In 1918, he won election as a Republican to the Sixty-sixth Congress and in 1920, won re-election to the Sixty-seventh Congress (March 4, 1919 – March 3, 1923). His candidacy for re-election in 1922 to the Sixty-eighth Congress was unsuccessful. He returned to his law practice and banking interests in Williamson as well as becoming a writer. He died in Cincinnati on March 2, 1944. He was buried at Fairview Cemetery in Williamson.

Sources

People from Williamson, West Virginia
People from Pulaski County, Virginia
West Virginia lawyers
1872 births
1944 deaths
19th-century American lawyers
20th-century American lawyers
Presidents of the West Virginia State Senate
Republican Party West Virginia state senators
Republican Party members of the West Virginia House of Delegates
Republican Party members of the United States House of Representatives from West Virginia
20th-century American politicians